Cayetano Pacana was the second Mayor of Cagayan de Misamis. He served as mayor from 1903–1905. He was a Hero of the Battle of Cagayan de Misamis in 1900.

Mayors of Cagayan de Oro